Fabulous Lola is a 1927 German silent comedy film directed by Richard Eichberg and starring Lilian Harvey, Harry Halm and Hans Junkermann. The film's sets were designed by the art director Jacek Rotmil. It was made at the Johannisthal Studios in Berlin.

The operetta was filmed again in 1954.

Cast
 Lilian Harvey as dancer Tilly Schneider aka Lola Cornero
 Harry Halm as music hall director Bendler
 Hans Junkermann as music hall director Dornwald
 Julia Serda as Agathe Dornwald
 Gyula Szőreghy as Enrique de la Plata

References

Bibliography
 Grange, William. Cultural Chronicle of the Weimar Republic. Scarecrow Press, 2008.

External links 
 

1927 films
Films of the Weimar Republic
German comedy films
German silent feature films
1927 comedy films
Films directed by Richard Eichberg
UFA GmbH films
German films based on plays
Films based on adaptations
Films based on operettas
German black-and-white films
Films shot at Johannisthal Studios
Silent comedy films
1920s German films
1920s German-language films